A solvent (from the Latin solvō, "loosen, untie, solve") is a substance that dissolves a solute, resulting in a solution. A solvent is usually a liquid but can also be a solid, a gas, or a supercritical fluid. Water is a solvent for polar molecules and the most common solvent used by living things; all the ions and proteins in a cell are dissolved in water within the cell.

Major uses of solvents are in paints, paint removers, inks, and dry cleaning. Specific uses for organic solvents are in dry cleaning (e.g. tetrachloroethylene); as paint thinners (toluene, turpentine); as nail polish removers and solvents of glue (acetone, methyl acetate, ethyl acetate); in spot removers (hexane, petrol ether); in detergents (citrus terpenes); and in perfumes (ethanol). Solvents find various applications in chemical, pharmaceutical, oil, and gas industries, including in chemical syntheses and purification processes.

Solutions and solvation
When one substance is dissolved into another, a solution is formed. This is opposed to the situation when the compounds are insoluble like sand in water. In a solution, all of the ingredients are uniformly distributed at a molecular level and no residue remains. A solvent-solute mixture consists of a single phase with all solute molecules occurring as solvates (solvent-solute complexes), as opposed to separate continuous phases as in suspensions, emulsions and other types of non-solution mixtures. The ability of one compound to be dissolved in another is known as solubility; if this occurs in all proportions, it is called miscible.

In addition to mixing, the substances in a solution interact with each other at the molecular level. When something is dissolved, molecules of the solvent arrange around molecules of the solute. Heat transfer is involved and entropy is increased making the solution more thermodynamically stable than the solute and solvent separately. This arrangement is mediated by the respective chemical properties of the solvent and solute, such as hydrogen bonding, dipole moment and polarizability. Solvation does not cause a chemical reaction or chemical configuration changes in the solute. However, solvation resembles a coordination complex formation reaction, often with considerable energetics (heat of solvation and entropy of solvation) and is thus far from a neutral process.

When one substance dissolves into another, a solution is formed. A solution is a homogeneous mixture consisting of a solute dissolved into a solvent. The solute is the substance that is being dissolved, while the solvent is the dissolving medium. Solutions can be formed with many different types and forms of solutes and solvents.

Solvent classifications
Solvents can be broadly classified into two categories: polar and non-polar. A special case is mercury, whose solutions are known as amalgams; also, other metal solutions exist which are liquid at room temperature.

Generally, the dielectric constant of the solvent provides a rough measure of a solvent's polarity. The strong polarity of water is indicated by its high dielectric constant of 88 (at 0 °C). Solvents with a dielectric constant of less than 15 are generally considered to be nonpolar.

The dielectric constant measures the solvent's tendency to partly cancel the field strength of the electric field of a charged particle immersed in it. This reduction is then compared to the field strength of the charged particle in a vacuum. Heuristically, the dielectric constant of a solvent can be thought of as its ability to reduce the solute's effective internal charge. Generally, the dielectric constant of a solvent is an acceptable predictor of the solvent's ability to dissolve common ionic compounds, such as salts.

Other polarity scales
Dielectric constants are not the only measure of polarity. Because solvents are used by chemists to carry out chemical reactions or observe chemical and biological phenomena, more specific measures of polarity are required. Most of these measures are sensitive to chemical structure.

The Grunwald–Winstein mY scale measures polarity in terms of solvent influence on buildup of positive charge of a solute during a chemical reaction.

Kosower's Z scale measures polarity in terms of the influence of the solvent on UV-absorption maxima of a salt, usually pyridinium iodide or the pyridinium zwitterion.

Donor number and donor acceptor scale measures polarity in terms of how a solvent interacts with specific substances, like a strong Lewis acid or a strong Lewis base.

The Hildebrand parameter is the square root of cohesive energy density. It can be used with nonpolar compounds, but cannot accommodate complex chemistry.

Reichardt's dye, a solvatochromic dye that changes color in response to polarity, gives a scale of ET(30) values. ET is the transition energy between the ground state and the lowest excited state in kcal/mol, and (30) identifies the dye. Another, roughly correlated scale (ET(33)) can be defined with Nile red.

The polarity, dipole moment, polarizability and hydrogen bonding of a solvent determines what type of compounds it is able to dissolve and with what other solvents or liquid compounds it is miscible. Generally, polar solvents dissolve polar compounds best and non-polar solvents dissolve non-polar compounds best; hence "like dissolves like". Strongly polar compounds like sugars (e.g. sucrose) or ionic compounds, like inorganic salts (e.g. table salt) dissolve only in very polar solvents like water, while strongly non-polar compounds like oils or waxes dissolve only in very non-polar organic solvents like hexane. Similarly, water and hexane (or vinegar and vegetable oil) are not miscible with each other and will quickly separate into two layers even after being shaken well.

Polarity can be separated to different contributions. For example, the Kamlet-Taft parameters are dipolarity/polarizability (π*), hydrogen-bonding acidity (α) and hydrogen-bonding basicity (β). These can be calculated from the wavelength shifts of 3–6 different solvatochromic dyes in the solvent, usually including Reichardt's dye, nitroaniline and diethylnitroaniline. Another option, Hansen's parameters, separate the cohesive energy density into dispersion, polar and hydrogen bonding contributions.

Polar protic and polar aprotic
Solvents with a dielectric constant (more accurately, relative static permittivity) greater than 15 (i.e. polar or polarizable) can be further divided into protic and aprotic. Protic solvents solvate anions (negatively charged solutes) strongly via hydrogen bonding. Water is a protic solvent. Aprotic solvents such as acetone or dichloromethane tend to have large dipole moments (separation of partial positive and partial negative charges within the same molecule) and solvate positively charged species via their negative dipole. In chemical reactions the use of polar protic solvents favors the SN1 reaction mechanism, while polar aprotic solvents favor the SN2 reaction mechanism. These polar solvents are capable of forming hydrogen bonds with water to dissolve in water whereas non-polar solvents are not capable of strong hydrogen bonds.

Multicomponent solvents 

Multicomponent solvents appeared after World War II in the USSR and continue to be used and produced in post-Soviet States. These solvents may have one or more applications, but they are not universal preparations.

Solvents

Thinners

Physical properties

Properties table of common solvents
The solvents are grouped into nonpolar, polar aprotic, and polar protic solvents, with each group ordered by increasing polarity. The properties of solvents which exceed those of water are bolded.

The ACS Green Chemistry Institute maintains a tool for the selection of solvents based on a principal component analysis of solvent properties.

Hansen solubility parameter values
The Hansen solubility parameter values are based on dispersion bonds (δD), polar bonds (δP) and hydrogen bonds (δH). These contain information about the inter-molecular interactions with other solvents and also with polymers, pigments, nanoparticles, etc. This allows for rational formulations knowing, for example, that there is a good HSP match between a solvent and a polymer. Rational substitutions can also be made for "good" solvents (effective at dissolving the solute) that are "bad" (expensive or hazardous to health or the environment). The following table shows that the intuitions from "non-polar", "polar aprotic" and "polar protic" are put numerically – the "polar" molecules have higher levels of δP and the protic solvents have higher levels of δH. Because numerical values are used, comparisons can be made rationally by comparing numbers. For example, acetonitrile is much more polar than acetone but exhibits slightly less hydrogen bonding.

If, for environmental or other reasons, a solvent or solvent blend is required to replace another of equivalent solvency, the substitution can be made on the basis of the Hansen solubility parameters of each. The values for mixtures are taken as the weighted averages of the values for the neat solvents. This can be calculated by trial-and-error, a spreadsheet of values, or HSP software. A 1:1 mixture of toluene and 1,4 dioxane has δD, δP and δH values of 17.8, 1.6 and 5.5, comparable to those of chloroform at 17.8, 3.1 and 5.7 respectively. Because of the health hazards associated with toluene itself, other mixtures of solvents may be found using a full HSP dataset.

Boiling point

The boiling point is an important property because it determines the speed of evaporation. Small amounts of low-boiling-point solvents like diethyl ether, dichloromethane, or acetone will evaporate in seconds at room temperature, while high-boiling-point solvents like water or dimethyl sulfoxide need higher temperatures, an air flow, or the application of vacuum for fast evaporation.
Low boilers: boiling point below 100 °C (boiling point of water)
Medium boilers: between 100 °C and 150 °C
High boilers: above 150 °C

Density
Most organic solvents have a lower density than water, which means they are lighter than and will form a layer on top of water. Important exceptions are most of the halogenated solvents like dichloromethane or chloroform will sink to the bottom of a container, leaving water as the top layer. This is crucial to remember when partitioning compounds between solvents and water in a separatory funnel during chemical syntheses.

Often, specific gravity is cited in place of density. Specific gravity is defined as the density of the solvent divided by the density of water at the same temperature. As such, specific gravity is a unitless value. It readily communicates whether a water-insoluble solvent will float (SG < 1.0) or sink (SG > 1.0) when mixed with water.

Safety

Fire
Most organic solvents are flammable or highly flammable, depending on their volatility. Exceptions are some chlorinated solvents like dichloromethane and chloroform. Mixtures of solvent vapors and air can explode. Solvent vapors are heavier than air; they will sink to the bottom and can travel large distances nearly undiluted. Solvent vapors can also be found in supposedly empty drums and cans, posing a flash fire hazard; hence empty containers of volatile solvents should be stored open and upside down.

Both diethyl ether and carbon disulfide have exceptionally low autoignition temperatures which increase greatly the fire risk associated with these solvents. The autoignition temperature of carbon disulfide is below 100 °C (212 °F), so objects such as steam pipes, light bulbs, hotplates, and recently extinguished bunsen burners are able to ignite its vapours.

In addition some solvents, such as methanol, can burn with a very hot flame which can be nearly invisible under some lighting conditions. This can delay or prevent the timely recognition of a dangerous fire, until flames spread to other materials.

Explosive peroxide formation
Ethers like diethyl ether and tetrahydrofuran (THF) can form highly explosive organic peroxides upon exposure to oxygen and light. THF is normally more likely to form such peroxides than diethyl ether. One of the most susceptible solvents is diisopropyl ether, but all ethers are considered to be potential peroxide sources.

The heteroatom (oxygen) stabilizes the formation of a free radical which is formed by the abstraction of a hydrogen atom by another free radical. The carbon-centred free radical thus formed is able to react with an oxygen molecule to form a peroxide compound. The process of peroxide formation is greatly accelerated by exposure to even low levels of light, but can proceed slowly even in dark conditions.

Unless a desiccant is used which can destroy the peroxides, they will concentrate during distillation, due to their higher boiling point. When sufficient peroxides have formed, they can form a crystalline, shock-sensitive solid precipitate at the mouth of a container or bottle. Minor mechanical disturbances, such as scraping the inside of a vessel or the dislodging of a deposit, merely twisting the cap may provide sufficient energy for the peroxide to explode or detonate. Peroxide formation is not a significant problem when fresh solvents are used up quickly; they are more of a problem in laboratories which may take years to finish a single bottle. Low-volume users should acquire only small amounts of peroxide-prone solvents, and dispose of old solvents on a regular periodic schedule.

To avoid explosive peroxide formation, ethers should be stored in an airtight container, away from light, because both light and air can encourage peroxide formation.

A number of tests can be used to detect the presence of a peroxide in an ether; one is to use a combination of iron(II) sulfate and potassium thiocyanate. The peroxide is able to oxidize the Fe2+ ion to an Fe3+ ion, which then forms a deep-red coordination complex with the thiocyanate.

Peroxides may be removed by washing with acidic iron(II) sulfate, filtering through alumina, or distilling from sodium/benzophenone. Alumina degrades the peroxides but some could remain intact in it, therefore it must be disposed of properly. The advantage of using sodium/benzophenone is that moisture and oxygen are removed as well.

Health effects
General health hazards associated with solvent exposure include toxicity to the nervous system, reproductive damage, liver and kidney damage, respiratory impairment, cancer, and dermatitis.

Acute exposure
Many solvents can lead to a sudden loss of consciousness if inhaled in large amounts. Solvents like diethyl ether and chloroform have been used in medicine as anesthetics, sedatives, and hypnotics for a long time. Ethanol (grain alcohol) is a widely used and abused psychoactive drug. 
Many solvents e.g. from gasoline or glues are abused recreationally in glue sniffing, often with harmful long-term health effects like neurotoxicity or cancer.  Fraudulent substitution of 1,5-pentanediol by the psychoactive 1,4-butanediol by a subcontractor caused the Bindeez product recall. If ingested, the so-called toxic alcohols (other than ethanol) such as methanol, 1-propanol, and ethylene glycol metabolize into toxic aldehydes and acids, which cause potentially fatal metabolic acidosis. The commonly available alcohol solvent methanol can cause permanent blindness or death if ingested. The solvent 2-butoxyethanol, used in fracking fluids, can cause hypotension and metabolic acidosis.

Chronic exposure

Some solvents including chloroform and benzene a common ingredient in gasoline are known to be carcinogenic, while many others are considered by the World Health Organization to be likely carcinogens. Solvents can damage internal organs like the liver, the kidneys, the nervous system, or the brain. The cumulative effects of long-term or repeated exposure to solvents are called chronic solvent-induced encephalopathy (CSE).

Chronic exposure to organic solvents in the work environment can produce a range of adverse neuropsychiatric effects. For example, occupational exposure to organic solvents has been associated with higher numbers of painters suffering from alcoholism. Ethanol has a synergistic effect when taken in combination with many solvents; for instance, a combination of toluene/benzene and ethanol causes greater nausea/vomiting than either substance alone.

Many solvents are known or suspected to be cataractogenic, greatly increasing the risk of developing cataracts in the lens of the eye. Solvent exposure has also been associated with neurotoxic damage causing hearing loss and color vision losses.

Environmental contamination
A major pathway to induce health effects arises from spills or leaks of solvents that reach the underlying soil. Since solvents readily migrate substantial distances, the creation of widespread soil contamination is not uncommon; this is particularly a health risk if aquifers are affected. Vapor intrusion can occur from sites with extensive subsurface solvent contamination.

See also 

 Free energy of solvation
 Solvents are often refluxed with an appropriate desiccant prior to distillation to remove water. This may be performed prior to a chemical synthesis where water may interfere with the intended reaction
 List of water-miscible solvents
 Lyoluminescence
 Occupational health
 Partition coefficient (log P) is a measure of differential solubility of a compound in two solvents
 Solvation
 Solvent systems exist outside the realm of ordinary organic solvents: Supercritical fluids, ionic liquids and deep eutectic solvents
 Water model
 Water pollution

References

Bibliography

External links 

Solvent selection tool ACS Green Chemistry Institute
"European Solvents Industry Group - ESIG - ESIG European Solvents Industry Group" Solvents in Europe.
Table and text O-Chem Lecture
Tables Properties and toxicities of organic solvents
CDC – Organic Solvents – NIOSH Workplace Safety and Health Topic
EPA – Solvent Contaminated Wipes

Soil contamination
 
Solutions
Chemical compounds

he:תמיסה#הממס